The Mitsubishi Electric Koalas are a basketball team based in Nagoya, Aichi, playing in the Women's Japan Basketball League.

Notable players
Teresa Edwards
Maki Eguchi
Michiko Miyamoto
Risa Nishioka
Asako O
Chika Sakuragi
Asami Tanaka

Coaches
Hiroko Tanabe

Practice facilities
Mitsubishi Electric Nagoya Gymnasium

References

External links
Official website

Basketball teams in Japan
Basketball teams established in 1956
1956 establishments in Japan